Ray Cornbill is an American former rugby union coach, best known for coaching the United States national rugby union team and the American Cougars.

Career 
Cornbill played for the Montreal Barbarians in 1962-1965 and was its captain in 1964.

Cornbill played for the Manhattan Rugby Football Club in 1965 and became its head coach in 1966.

In 1976, Cornbill became the head coach of the United States national rugby union team. He left the position in 1983, but returned in 2000 as assistant coach.

In 1978, Cornbill became the head coach of the American Cougars.

Awards 
Cornbill was inducted into the U.S. Rugby Hall of Fame in 2013 and into the Maccabi USA Rugby Hall of Fame in 2018.

References

United States national rugby union team coaches
Living people
Rugby union flankers
Year of birth missing (living people)